Anthony Callea is the debut album of Anthony Callea. It was released on 25 March 2005. The album debuted at number one on the ARIA Albums Chart on the week of 4 April 2005. It held the top spot on the chart for three weeks before dropping to number three. The album was certified double platinum by ARIA.

The first single, "The Prayer", was released in December 2004 and debuted on the ARIA Singles Chart at number one, remaining at the top spot for five weeks straight. It was certified four times Platinum, selling in excess of 280,000 copies and was the highest-selling single in Australia in 2005. In 2010 ARIA named it the second-highest selling single of the previous decade, which also made it the second-highest selling Australian artist song of that decade. His second single was the double A-side "Rain"/"Bridge over Troubled Water" released the week before Easter, which also debuted at number one and held the spot for two weeks. Callea's third single "Hurts So Bad" debuted at number ten on the ARIA Charts. The fourth single released from Anthony Callea—"Per Sempre (for Always)"—made its debut at number five on the ARIA Charts. It was released in two formats—as a standard CD single and a DVD single.

Track listing

Charts

Weekly charts

Year-end charts

Certifications

References

2005 debut albums
Anthony Callea albums